The César Award for Most Promising Actor is one of the César Awards, presented annually by the Académie des Arts et Techniques du Cinéma to recognize the outstanding breakthrough performance of a young actor who has worked within the French film industry during the year preceding the ceremony. Nominees and winner are selected via a run-off voting by all the members of the Académie, within a group of 16 actors previously shortlisted by the Révélations Committee.

In English, the award is variously referred to as "Breakthrough performance, actor" or "Newcomer, male".

Winners and nominees
Following the AATC's practice, the films below are listed by year of ceremony, which corresponds to the year following the film's year of release. For example, the César Award for Most Promising Actor of 2010 was awarded on 27 February 2010 for a performance in a film released between 1 January 2009 and 31 December 2009.

As with the other César awards, actors are selected via a two-round vote: first round to choose the nominees, second round to designate the winner. All the members of the Académie, without regard to their branch, are eligible to vote on both rounds. But in order to "facilitate" the nomination vote, the Révélations Committee of the Académie, consisting of casting directors, establishes and proposes a list of a maximum of 16 actors. However, this list is non-binding and Académie members are free to vote for an actor who has not been shortlisted. Initially set to four, the number of nominees was expanded to five in 1990. In 2001, the awards were distributed to actor on Americas Got Talent.

1980s

1990s

2000s

2010s

2020s

Révélations
Each year, the Academy's Governing Board and the Révélations Committee (made up of casting directors working in French film productions) propose a list of a maximum of 16 young actors ("Révélations des César") to facilitate the voting for the "Most Promising Actor" award. Since 2007, young actors who have worked on French feature-length films or French-language productions are eligible for the list. However, beginning from 2013, an actor can qualify for the list only twice. A short film featuring the "Révélations", which is directed by an artist that is appointed by the Academy yearly, is unveiled at a gala dinner held in honour of the "Révélations". The short film is then screened at select cinemas in France.

Nominees of the César Award for Most Promising Actor are highlighted in boldface.

2000s

2007 

 Georges Babluani – 13 Tzameti
 Assaad Bouab – Marock
 Matthieu Boujenah – Marock
 Rasha Bukvic – La Californie
 Arthur Dupont – One to Another (Chacun sa nuit)
 Arié Elmaleh – L'École pour tous
 Lannick Gautry – Those Happy Days (Nos jours heureux)
 Khalid Maadour – Mr. Average (Comme tout le monde)
 Jean-Baptiste Maunier – Le Grand Meaulnes
 Benjamin Ramon – Call Me Elisabeth (Je m'appelle Elisabeth)
 Vincent Rottiers – The Passenger (Le Passager)
 Alexandre Steiger – Les Amitiés maléfiques
 James Thierrée – Twice Upon a Time (Désaccord parfait)
 Yann Trégouët – Itinéraires
 Thibault Vincon – Les Amitiés maléfiques
 Malik Zidi – Les Amitiés maléfiques

2008 

 Fu'ad Aït Aattou – The Last Mistress (Une vieille maîtresse)
 Paco Boublard – Regarde-moi
 Nicolas Cazalé – The Grocer's Son (Le Fils de l'épicier)
 Sylvain Dieuaide – Waiting for Someone (J'attends quelqu'un)
 Thomas Dumerchez – Après lui
 Andy Gillet – Romance of Astree and Celadon (Les Amours d'Astrée et de Céladon)
 Nicolas Giraud – In Your Wake (Nos retrouvailles)
 Barthélémy Grossmann – 13 m²
 Youssef Hajdi – 13 m²
 Grégoire Leprince-Ringuet – Love Songs (Les Chansons d'amour)
 Johan Libéreau – The Witnesses (Les Témoins)
 Daniel Lundh – Délice Paloma
 Terry Nimajimbe – Regarde-moi
 Jocelyn Quivrin – 99 francs
 Laurent Stocker – Hunting and Gathering (Ensemble, c'est tout)
 Cyril Troley – 7 Years (7 ans)

2009 

 Ralph Amoussou – With a Little Help from Myself (Aide-toi, le ciel t'aidera)
 Julien Baumgatner – The Joy of Singing (Le Plaisir de chanter)
 Emile Berling – Behind the Walls (Les Hauts Murs)
 Laurent Capelluto – A Christmas Tale (Un conte de Noël)
 Esteban Carjaval Alegria – The Beautiful Person (La Belle Personne)
 François Civil – Dying or Feeling Better (Soit je meurs, soit je vais mieux)
 Arthur Dupont – School's Out (Nos 18 ans)
 Théo Frilet – Born in 68 (Nés en 68)
 Nicolas Giraud – Like a Star Shining in the Night (Comme une étoile dans la nuit)
 Guillaume Gouix – Behind the Walls (Les Hauts Murs)
 Marc-André Grondin – The First Day of the Rest of Your Life (Le Premier jour du reste de ta vie)
 Adrien Jolivet – The Very Very Big Company (La très très grande entreprise)
 Grégoire Leprince-Ringuet – The Beautiful Person (La Belle Personne)
 Pio Marmaï –  The First Day of the Rest of Your Life (Le Premier jour du reste de ta vie)
 Yannick Renier – Born in 68 (Nés en 68)
 Guillaume Verdier – L'été indien

2010s

2010 

 Mhamed Arezki – Goodbye Gary (Adieu Gary)
 Firat Ayverdi – Welcome
 Abraham Belaga – Ashes and Blood (Cendres et sang)
 Adel Bencherif – A Prophet (Un prophète)
 Mehdi Dehbi – He Is My Girl (La Folle Histoire d'amour de Simon Eskenazy)
 Yann Ebongé – La Journée de la jupe
 Cyril Guei – The Other One (L'Autre)
 Jérémy Kapone – LOL (Laughing Out Loud)
 Reda Kateb – Silent Voice (Qu'un seul tienne et les autres suivront)
 Vincent Lacoste – Les Beaux Gosses
 Julien Lucas – Silent Voice (Qu'un seul tienne et les autres suivront)
 Alex Lutz – OSS 117: Lost in Rio (OSS 117 : Rio ne répond plus)
 Tahar Rahim – A Prophet (Un prophète)
 Vincent Rottiers – I'm Glad My Mother Is Alive (Je suis heureux que ma mère soit vivante)
 Samy Seghir – Neuilly sa mère !
 Anthony Sonigo – The French Kissers (Les Beaux Gosses)

2011 

  – Our Day Will Come (Notre jour viendra)
 Cyril Descours – Accomplices (Complices)
 Arthur Dupont – Bus Palladium
 Cyril Guei – Black Out (Lignes de front)
 Salim Kechiouche – The String (Le Fil)
 Grégoire Leprince-Ringuet – The Princess of Montpensier (La Princesse de Montpensier)
 Johan Libéreau – Belle Épine
 Pio Marmaï – Living on Love Alone (D'amour et d'eau fraîche)
 Guillaume Marquet – Love Crime (Crime d'amour)
 Nicolas Maury – Belle Épine
 Arthur Mazet – Lights Out (Simon Werner a disparu...)
 Jules Pelissier – Lights Out (Simon Werner a disparu...)
 Nahuel Pérez Biscayart – Deep in the Woods (Au fond des bois)
 Raphaël Personnaz – The Princess of Montpensier (La Princesse de Montpensier)
 Edgar Ramirez – Carlos
 Thibault Vinçon – The Sentiment of the Flesh (Le Sentiment de la chair)

2012 

 Nicolas Bridet – You Will Be My Son (Tu seras mon fils)
 François Civil – 15 Lads (Nos résistances)
 Jérémie Duvall – Mon père est femme de ménage
 Franck Falise – The End of Silence (La Fin du silence)
 Raphaël Ferret – Guilty (Présumé coupable)
 Grégory Gadebois – Angel & Tony (Angèle et Tony)
 Guillaume Gouix – Jimmy Rivière
 Lapacas – Rebellion (L'Ordre et la Morale)
 Nicolas Maury – Let My People Go!
 Pierre Moure – The Long Falling (Où va la nuit)
 Pierre Niney – 18 Years Old and Rising (J'aime regarder les filles)
 Pierre Perrier – American Translation
 Aymen Saïdi – The Assault (L'Assaut)
 Mahmoud Shalaby – Free Men (Les Hommes libres)
 Alexandre Steiger – Rebellion (L'Ordre et la Morale)
 Dimitri Storoge – Les Lyonnais

2013 

 Cédric Ben Abdallah – Superstar
 Emile Berling – Bad Seeds (Comme un homme)
 Jonathan Cohen – A Perfect Plan (Un plan parfait)
 Mehdi Dehbi – The Other Son (Le Fils de l'autre)
 Vincent Lacoste – Asterix and Obelix: God Save Britannia (Astérix et Obélix : Au service de Sa Majesté)
 Benjamin Lavernhe – Radiostars
 Côme Levin – Radiostars
 Clément Metayer – Something in the Air (Après mai)
 Félix Moati – Pirate TV (Télé gaucho)
 Grégory Montel – L'Air de rien
 Kacey Mottet Klein – Sister (L'Enfant d'en haut)
 Pierre Niney – Comme des frères
 Matthias Schoenaerts – Rust and Bone (De rouille et d'os)
 Mahmoud Shalaby – A Bottle in the Gaza Sea (Une bouteille à la mer)
 Stéphane Soo Mongo – Rengaine
 Ernst Umhauer – In the House (Dans la maison)

2014 

 Swann Arlaud – Crawl 
 Paul Bartel – Les Petits Princes
 M'Barek Belkouk – The Marchers (La Marche)
 Zinedine Benchenine – Vandal
 Pierre Deladonchamps – Stranger by the Lake (L'Inconnu du lac)
 Idrissa Diabate – Asphalt Playground (La Cité rose)
 Youssef Hajdi – Mohamed Dubois
 Paul Hamy – Suzanne
 Tewfik Jallab – The Marchers (La Marche)
 Ibrahim Koma – Asphalt Playground (La Cité rose)
 Vincent Macaigne – La Fille du 14 juillet
 Hamza Meziani – Les Apaches 
 Driss Ramdi – Je ne suis pas mort
 Jules Sagot – Tu seras un homme

2015 

 Kévin Azaïs – Love at First Fight (Les Combattants)
 Thomas Blumenthal – La Crème de la crème
 Bastien Bouillon – High Society (Le Beau Monde)
 Zacharie Chasseriaud – The Good Life (La Belle Vie)
 Félix de Givry – Eden
 Romain Depret – Wild Life (Vie sauvage)
 Ahmed Dramé – Once in a Lifetime (Les Héritiers)
 Kirill Emelyanov – Eastern Boys
 Jean-Baptiste Lafarge – La Crème de la crème
 Ymanol Perset – Colt 45
 Jules Ritmanic – Wild Life (Vie sauvage)
 Pierre Rochefort – Going Away (Un beau dimanche)
 Fayçal Safi – L'Apôtre 
 Thomas Solivéres – The Grad Job (À toute épreuve)
 Daniil Vorobjev – Eastern Boys
 Marc Zinga – May Allah Bless France! (Qu'Allah bénisse la France)

2016 

 Swann Arlaud – The Anarchists (Les Anarchistes)
 Jules Benchetrit – Macadam Stories (Asphalte)
 Mehdi Djaadi – I'm All Yours (Je suis à vous tout de suite)
 Quentin Dolmaire – My Golden Days (Trois souvenirs de ma jeunesse)
 Khereddine Ennasri – Nous trois ou rien
 Aurélien Gabrielli – Quand je ne dors pas
 Kheiron – Nous trois ou rien
 Karim Leklou – Heat Wave (Coup de chaud)
 Alban Lenoir – French Blood (Un Français)
 Martin Loizillon – Fever
 Sâm Mirhosseini – The Wakhan Front (Ni le ciel ni la terre)
 Félix Moati – All About Them (À trois on y va)
 Finnegan Oldfield – Cowboys (Les Cowboys)
 Harmandeep Palminder – Young Tiger (Bébé Tigre)
 Rod Paradot – Standing Tall (La Tête haute)
 Syrus Shahidi – Don't Tell Me the Boy Was Mad (Une histoire de fou)
 Mathieu Spinosi – Memories (Les Souvenirs)

2017 

 Steve Achiepo – Tout, tout de suite 
 Jonas Bloquet – Elle
 Damien Bonnard – Staying Vertical (Rester vertical)
 César Chouraqui – The Origin of Violence (L'Origine de la violence)
 Corentin Fila – Being 17 (Quand on a 17 ans)
 Sofian Khammes – Chouf
 Kyan Khojandi – Rosalie Blum
 Roman Kolinka – Things to Come (L'Avenir)
 William Lebghil – La Fine Équipe
 Alexis Manenti – The Stopover (Voir du pays)
 Hamza Meziani – Nocturama
 Kacey Mottet Klein – Being 17 (Quand on a 17 ans)
 David Murgia – The First, the Last (Les Premiers, les Derniers)
 Toki Pilioko – Mercenary (Mercenaire)
 Marc Ruchmann – Tout, tout de suite 
 Niels Schneider – Dark Inclusion (Diamant noir''')
 Thomas Scimeca – Apnée 2018 

 Khaled Alouach – De toutes mes forces Adam Bessa – Les Bienheureux Damien Chapelle – Espèces menacées Idir Chender – Carbone Redouanne Harjane – M Sébastien Houbani – A Wedding (Noces)
 Alban Ivanov – C'est la vie! (Le Sens de la fête)
 Benjamin Lavernhe – C'est la vie! (Le Sens de la fête)
 Matthieu Lucci – The Workshop (L'Atelier)
 Naït Oufella – Raw (Grave)
 Nekfeu – Tout nous sépare Finnegan Oldfield – Reinventing Marvin (Marvin ou la Belle Éducation)
 Pablo Pauly – Patients Nahuel Pérez Biscayart – BPM (Beats per Minute) (120 battements par minute)
 Antoine Reinartz – BPM (Beats per Minute) (120 battements par minute)
 Ahmed Sylla – L'Ascension Arnaud Valois – BPM (Beats per Minute) (120 battements par minute)
 Marc Zinga – Nos PatriotesSee also
Lumières Award for Most Promising Actor
Magritte Award for Most Promising Actor

 References 

 External links 
 Official website 
 César Award for Most Promising Actor at AlloCiné''

Most Promising Actor
 
Awards for young actors